Paranillopsis is a genus of ground beetles in the family Carabidae. There are at least two described species in Paranillopsis found in Argentina.

Species
These two species belong to the genus Paranillopsis:
 Paranillopsis pampensis Cicchino & Roig-Juñent, 2001
 Paranillopsis piguensis Cicchino & Roig-Juñent, 2001

References

Trechinae